Richard Gerrit Coss is an American evolutionary psychologist, and academic. He is a Professor Emeritus of Psychology at the University of California, Davis.

Coss' research interest spans the field of behavioral evolution, with a particular focus on analyzing adaptive variation in antipredator behavior in different populations, and the impact of developmental, physiological, and neurobiological constraints on behavior. He is most known for his work on dendritic spine plasticity, and early contributions to the field of evolutionary aesthetic preferences. He has also authored and co-authored more than 130 peer-reviewed journal articles and is the editor of the book Environmental Awareness: Evolutionary, Aesthetic and Social Perspectives.

Coss is a Fellow of the Association for Psychological Science and has been a member of numerous professional societies, including the Animal Behavior Society and the International Society for the Arts, Sciences and Technology.

Early life and education
Coss was born on January 3, 1940, in Sanger, California. He is the son of Dr. Joe Glenn and Cornelia Geraldine Coss. After completing his early education, he enrolled at the University of Southern California and graduated in 1962 with a major in Industrial Design in the School of Architecture. Later in 1966, he earned his master's degree in design from the University of California, Los Angeles. In 1973, he completed his Ph.D. in Comparative psychology at the University of Reading in the UK, where Corinne Hutt was his dissertation adviser. For his dissertation, Coss conducted comparative research on the perceptual aspects of eye-like schemata in African jewelfish, mouse lemurs, and autistic and typically developing children.

Career
Coss started his academic career in 1971, as a lecturer of design at the University of California, Los Angeles. After earning his Ph.D. in psychology, he became an assistant professor of psychology at the University of California, Davis. He was later promoted to associate professor in 1978 and became a professor of psychology in 1984. Since 2014, he has been serving as Professor Emeritus of Psychology at the University of California, Davis.

Coss worked at Douglas Aircraft Company from 1962 to 1966. Afterwards, in 1966 he held an appointment as Research Director at the Compagnie de l'Esthetique Industrielle in France that developed the corporate identity for the Shell Oil Corporation. Later, in 1986, he received a Fellowship by the NASA-Ames Research Center where he aided in evaluating ways to enhance space-station interiors for long-term habitation.

Research
At the beginning of his career, Coss focused his research on human-factors engineering with aerospace applications at Douglas Aircraft Company. In this context, he was appointed Project Engineer for a lunar-base design proposal to NASA using, for habitation, the spherical tanks manufactured for the second stage of the Saturn 5 lunar rocket. He has studied environmental aesthetics with respect to art and design. Later, his work was aimed at analyzing the antipredator behavior of several species in both field and laboratory conditions as model systems for understanding the development of innate behavior and aesthetic preferences in the context of human evolutionary history. He has published numerous articles in scientific journals and was the recipient of a patent for creating an apparatus for measuring pupillary dilation.

Behavioral evolution and environmental aesthetics 
Coss published a monograph in 1965 that described his visual perception research based on his theory that human ancestors were the prey of predators for a sufficient evolutionary time to engender innate recognition of predator features including two-facing eyes, sharp teeth, and claws. Subsequently, he posited that recognizing such specific provocative shapes enhanced emotional arousal in a manner that have had an impact on works of art, architecture, and product design.

While working on behavioral evolution, Coss identified that, despite having relaxed natural selection from snake predation for more than 300,000 years, California ground squirrels are still capable of distinguishing their rattlesnake and gopher snake predators as compared with Arctic ground squirrels that have lost this ability over 3 million years. However, both species under prolonged relaxed selection have also lost their physiological resistance to rattlesnake venom. Following this research, he hypothesized that "evolved cognitive behavior in humans might persist for as long as 3 million years of relaxed selection" and to test this hypothesis he assessed the preschool children's selection of schematic trees as a form of refuge from predators and their overall refuge-seeking behavior on the playground, particularly by investigating whether historical sexual-size dimorphism plays a role in influencing such behavior. Subsequently, he examined the remembrances in pre-school children and adults of where "something scary" was located in their imagination relative to their beds at night producing findings which reinforced his argument that ancestral sources of natural selection might continue to bias modern aesthetic expression.

Innate pattern recognition
Coss has been acknowledged for his substantial work on the innate pattern-recognition ability of different species. He elucidated that the salient effects of glossy and sparkling surface finishes attract infants and toddlers, increasing the possibilities of endangering their life by drowning or suffocation from plastic bags and described that viewing water has calming effects on adults. Furthermore, he discovered that wild California ground squirrels, white-faced capuchin monkeys, and bonnet macaques are capable of recognizing their snake predators by their size and scale patterns and, for bonnet macaques, their leopard predators by the spots on their coat. He later documented that young human infants are visually attracted reliably to snake-scale and leopard-spot patterns.

Dendritic spine plasticity
Coss evaluated the provocative effects of two-facing eyes in humans and worked on the brain development and behavior of jewel fish which led him to a cover article in Science. His joint study with A. Globus revealed that, due to social deprivation, the formation of dendritic branches in the optic tectum was arrested as was the experience-based shortening of dendritic spine stems. Moreover, a single threatening experience shortened dendritic spine stems in the optic tectum, and enhanced fish behavioral excitability in a manner analogous to PTSD in humans. In related research, he examined developing honeybees and observed the shortening of dendritic spine stems on calycal interneurons with progressive nursing and foraging experiences and also during their first orientation flight.

Evolutionary constraints
Coss also conducted a research series to explore the sources of natural selection mediating human brain evolution. This led to experiments measuring flight distances of wild horses in Arizona and African zebras to an approaching human. The lower fear of wild horses compared with zebras led to his hypothesis that extensive human hunting in Africa might have led to an arm's race for more competent hunting by humans to counter the increasingly evasive ability of wary prey. Such an arm's race for enhanced visual and spatial competence in hunting might explain the enlargement of the human parietal cortex for accurate spear throwing as well the ability of modern humans to translate mental images into figurative art with significant cultural impact. In contrast, the lack of figurative art among European Neanderthals, who likely hunted less wary game with thrusting spears during the Middle Paleolithic, might account for the smaller size of the Neanderthal parietal cortex that limited their artistic expression.

Animal welfare
Apart from working on environmental aesthetics and behavioral evolution, Coss has contributed to animal welfare by examining the impacts of human intrusions in wildlife habitats. He advised graduate students studying African wild dogs and found that black-tailed deer in coastal California unaccustomed to humans were highly cautious when a human approached. While working in India, he studied the sleeping-site selection of bonnet macaques living near human settlements, and also examined the decline in tigers caused by the loss of palatable vegetation for large tiger prey. Also in India, he studied crop-raiding by Asian Elephants, and found that crop-raiding could be thwarted when elephant-activated tiger growls were played back to them.

Bibliography

Books
Mood Provoking Visual Stimuli: Their Origins and Applications (1965) 
Environmental Awareness: Evolutionary, Aesthetic & Social Perspectives (2005) ISBN 978-0757520112

Selected articles
Coss, R. G. (1968). The ethological command in art. Leonardo 1, 273–287. The Ethological Command in Art
Coss, R. G. & Perkel, D. H. (1985). The function of dendritic spines:  A review of theoretical issues. Behavioral and Neural Biology, 44, 151–185. The function of dendritic spines: A review of theoretical issues
Coss, R. G. (1999). Effects of relaxed natural selection on the evolution of behavior. Geographic Variation in Behavior: Perspectives on Evolutionary Mechanisms (Foster, S. & Endler, J. A., eds). Oxford University Press, Oxford, 180–208.
Coss, R. G. (2003). The role of evolved perceptual biases in art and design. Evolutionary Aesthetics (Voland, E. & Grammer, K (eds). Springer-Verlag, Heidelberg, 69–130. Evolutionary Aesthetics
Coss, R. G. (2017). Drawings of representational images by Upper Paleolithic humans and their absence in Neanderthals reflect historical differences in hunting wary game. Evolutionary Studies in Imaginative Culture, 1(2), 15–38. 
Coss, R. G., and Keller, C. M. (2022). Transient decreases in blood pressure and heart rate with increased subjective level of relaxation while viewing water compared with adjacent ground. Journal of Environmental Psychology, 81, 101794. Transient decreases in blood pressure and heart rate with increased subjective level of relaxation while viewing water compared with adjacent ground

References

Living people
American psychologists
American academics